Briar is a census-designated place (CDP) in Parker, Tarrant and Wise counties in the U.S. state of Texas, near the west side of Eagle Mountain Lake.The population was 5,665 at the 2010 census.

Geography
Briar is located at  (32.973507, -97.540710).

Demographics

2020 census

As of the 2020 United States census, there were 7,035 people, 1,908 households, and 1,437 families residing in the CDP.

2000 census
At the 2000 census there were 5,350 people, 1,923 households and 1,505 families in the CDP. The racial make-up of the CDP was 95.48% White, 0.47% African American, 0.71% Native American, 0.37% Asian, 1.44% from other races and 1.53% from two or more races. Hispanic or Latino of any race were 4.43%.

Of the 1,923 households, 35.3% had children under the age of 18 living with them, 64.8% were married couples living together, 8.8% had a female householder with no husband present, and 21.7% were non-families. 17.0% of households were one person and 4.8% were one person aged 65 or older. The average household size was 2.78 and the average family size was 3.12.

The age distribution was 28.0% under the age of 18, 6.3% from 18 to 24, 29.4% from 25 to 44, 25.9% from 45 to 64, and 10.4% 65 or older. The median age was 37 years. For every 100 females, there were 97.1 males. For every 100 females age 18 and over, there were 100.7 males.

The median household income was $46,646 and the median family income was $53,169. Males had a median income of $40,401 and females $26,616. The per capita income was $19,912. About 4.5% of families and 5.6% of the population were below the poverty line, including 5.3% of those under age 18 and 6.3% of those age 65 or over.

Facilities
Briar has three convenience stores, a liquor store and a bar. One of the stores also has a grill-type restaurant. It is located close to Azle and Boyd, towns with a wide variety of retail businesses. Briar has several churches and a quaint, small-town feel.

Education
Briar is served by the Azle, Boyd and Springtown Independent School Districts.

References

Dallas–Fort Worth metroplex
Census-designated places in Parker County, Texas
Census-designated places in Tarrant County, Texas
Census-designated places in Wise County, Texas
Census-designated places in Texas